is the 37th studio album by Japanese singer-songwriter Miyuki Nakajima, released in October 2010.

None of the songs appeared on the album was released as a single. Instead, two of previous released materials were featured as bonus tracks; her own interpretation of the song "Snow Umbrella" originally recorded by Shizuka Kudo in 2008, and new recording of her recent single "Just Save Love" released in 2009. The song "It's a Dream" was simultaneously covered by Makichang (then-23-year-old female singer-songwriter who've contracted with Nakajima's management office). Her version was released as a double A-Side single with her original composition "Anata no Inai Heya ni Nareru Hi ga Kuru Made" by VAP Records.

Midnight Zoo debuted at No. 5 on the Japanese Oricon Weekly albums chart, making Nakajima the first female solo artist to have had the country's top-10 charting albums in five consecutive decades – three male musicians have already set this record; Eric Clapton, Eikichi Yazawa and Masashi Sada. The album has sold over 40,000 copies as of December 2010.

Track listing
All songs written and composed by Miyuki Nakajima, arranged by Ichizo Seo (except M1/10 co-arranged by Satoshi Nakamura, and M11 co-arranged by Shingo Kobayashi)
"" – 5:09
"" – 7:13
"" – 4:26
"" – 4:19
"" – 6:51
"" – 5:26
"" – 4:11
"" – 4:28
"" – 6:13
"" – 5:42
Bonus tracks
"" – 6:00
"" (album version) – 6:26

Personnel
Miyuki Nakajima – Lead and background vocals
Kenny Aronoff – Drums
Vinnie Colaiuta – Drums
Neil Stubenhaus – Electric bass
Michael Landau – Electric guitar, acoustic guitar
Michael Thompson – Electric guitar, acoustic guitar, flat mandolin
Dean Parks – Acoustic guitar
Nozomi Furukawa – Electric guitar
Jon Gilutin – Acoustic piano, electric piano, keyboards, hammond organ
Shingo Kobayashi – Acoustic piano, keyboards, synth programming
Mataro Misawa – Percussion
Shuichiro Terao – Percussion loop
Shigeo Fuchino – Saxophone
Satoshi Nakamura – Saxophone
Taro Shizuoka – Trombone
Shiro Sasaki – Trumpet
Ittetsu Gen – Violin
Maki Nagata – Violin
Daisuke Kadowaki – Violin
Crusher Kimura – Violin
Takao Ochiai – Violin
Nobuko Kaiwa – Violin
Kaoru Kuroki – Violin
Kenta Kuroki – Violin
Yoshiko Kaneko – Violin
Choi Song-il – Violin
Naoko Ishibashi – Violin
Makiko Murakoshi – Violin
Yuichi Endo – Violin
Hiroki Muto – Violin
Izumiko Fujiie – Violin
Soki Nagaoka – Violin
Rei Yokomizo – Violin
Kyoko Ishigame – Violin
Asako Sugano – Violin
Takayuki Oshikane – Violin
Yoko Fujinawa – Violin
Takuya Mori – Viola
Shoko Miki – Viola
Kaori Morita – Cello
Tomoki Iwanaga – Cello
Ichizo Seo – Background vocals
Fumikazu Miyashita – Background vocals
Yuiko Tsubokura – Background vocals
Kazuyo Sugimoto – Background vocals
Julia Waters – Background vocals
Maxine Waters – Background vocals
Oren Waters – Background vocals

Chart positions

Release history

References

2010 albums
Miyuki Nakajima albums